Tutufa rubeta is a species of sea snail, a marine gastropod mollusk in the family Bursidae, the frog shells.

Description
The length of the shell attains 95 mm.

Distribution
This marine species occurs off the Philippines.

References

 Vine, P. (1986). Red Sea Invertebrates. Immel Publishing, London. 224 pp.
 Steyn, D. G.; Lussi, M. (2005). Offshore Shells of Southern Africa: A pictorial guide to more than 750 Gastropods. Published by the authors. pp. i–vi, 1–289.

External links
 Linnaeus, C. (1758). Systema Naturae per regna tria naturae, secundum classes, ordines, genera, species, cum characteribus, differentiis, synonymis, locis. Editio decima, reformata [10th revised edition, vol. 1: 824 pp. Laurentius Salvius: Holmiae]
 Jousseaume, F. (1881). Description de nouvelles coquilles. Bulletin de la Société zoologique de France. 6: 172-188
 Schumacher, C. F. (1817). Essai d'un nouveau système des habitations des vers testacés. Schultz, Copenghagen. iv + 288 pp., 22 pls.
 Röding, P. F. (1798). Museum Boltenianum sive Catalogus cimeliorum e tribus regnis naturæ quæ olim collegerat Joa. Fried Bolten, M. D. p. d. per XL. annos proto physicus Hamburgensis. Pars secunda continens Conchylia sive Testacea univalvia, bivalvia & multivalvia. Trapp, Hamburg. viii, 199 pp.

Bursidae
Gastropods described in 1758
Taxa named by Carl Linnaeus